Athrinacia psephophragma is a moth in the family Depressariidae. It was described by Edward Meyrick in 1929. It is found in Brazil.

References

Moths described in 1929
Athrinacia
Taxa named by Edward Meyrick